Kungfu Cyborg is a 2009 Hong Kong science fiction action film directed by Jeffrey Lau.

Plot

In the near future, De Ming is one of China's top leading officers in the law enforcement. He is a cyborg designed to handle assignments too dangerous for traditional methods, and is the first in the TN Research Bureau's "K Series"—a revolutionary cybernetic organism programmed with a sophisticated social conscience.

De Ming is sent to a remote town as part of a covert training operation, placed under the supervision of the local police captain, Xu Dachun. Xu's mission is to facilitate De Ming's undercover integration into the community while protecting the secret of his young protégé's true identity. De Ming's charm and compassion for justice are quick to win the hearts of the town residents—though none more completely than that of Su Mei, a fellow officer who also happens to be the object of the captain's secret affection.

Eventually, one of De Ming's cybernetic siblings, the K-88, has disappeared after suffering a critical neural meltdown. Xu and Ming hunt down and confront the malfunctioning cyborg in a spectacular clash of artificial wills that leaves the captain scarred, and De Ming gradually becomes confused and conflicted over his role in human society.

While the mission is a success, consequences of De Ming's actions continue to haunt him, and Xu's behavior has become increasingly strange and erratic after the battle with the K-88, a fact that De Ming feels compelled to hide from co-workers and superiors. Su Mei's behavior also becomes troubled as she is incapable of understanding that as a machine, Ming is unable to love her in the way she so desperately desires.

Torn between his bond to humanity and the knowledge that he will never be a part of it, De Ming, unprepared, must find within himself the strength to defeat the group of cyborg assassins that has descended on the town to avenge his betrayal of the cyborgs.

Cast
Hu Jun as Xu Dachun
Betty Sun as Zhou Sumei
Alex Fong as De Ming/K-1
Gan Wei as Zhou Suqing
Ronald Cheng as Jiang
Wu Jing as K-88
Eric Tsang as Lin Xiang
Law Kar-ying as Ying Ming
Lee Kin-yan as Yu Hua

Awards and nominations
29th Hong Kong Film Awards
 Nominated: Best Visual Effects (Cecil Cheng Man Ching and Don Ma Wing On)

References

External links

2009 science fiction action films
Hong Kong science fiction action films
2000s Cantonese-language films
2009 films
Films directed by Jeffrey Lau
2000s Hong Kong films